Doyle Township may refer to the following townships in the United States:

 Doyle Township, Clarke County, Iowa
 Doyle Township, Marion County, Kansas
 Doyle Township, Michigan